Prey Nob is one of four districts (srok) of Sihanoukville Province in Cambodia.  According to the 2008
census of Cambodia, it had a population of 89,238.

Notes

Districts of Sihanoukville province